Niccolò "Nicola" Matas (6 December 1798 – 11 March 1872) was an Italian architect and professor. He is best known for being the architect of the 19th century Gothic Revival façade of the Basilica of Santa Croce in Florence, Italy. Matas was a professor at the Academy of Fine Arts, Florence. He is one of the important architects in the history of the city of Florence.

Early life 
Niccolò "Nicola" Matas was born on December 6. 1798 in Ancona in Marche, Papal States (now present-day Italy). His family was Jewish and of Spanish descent. He studied at Academy of Fine Arts, Rome; followed by study at the Academy of Fine Arts, Venice and the Academy of Fine Arts, Vicenza.

Career 
In 1825, Matas moved to Florence, where he was an academic professor at the Academy of Fine Arts, Florence, primarily teaching architecture. His architect contemporaries in Tuscany included Gaetano Baccani, Mariano Falcini, Emilio De Fabris, and Giuseppe Poggi. Matas worked closely with sculptor Giovanni Dupré of Gipsoteca Dupré. He had a working relationship with Anatoly Demidov, 1st Prince of San Donato.

From 1857 to 1863, he worked on the design of the façade of Basilica of Santa Croce, where he worked in a prominent Star of David into the top of the building. The design of the building was said to be influenced by a now-lost drawing by Simone del Pollaiolo, named "il Cronaca". He is also thought to have been inspired by the Siena Cathedral and Orvieto Cathedral.

Matas died in Florence on 11 March 1872. His body was moved in 1886, and Matas is buried under the porch at the Basilica of Santa Croce.

There is a street named "Via Matas" in Ancona.

Works

Restorations 
 1834, Ancona Cathedral, Ancona, Marche, Italy, he restored the building and the dome with copper
 1836, Florence, Tuscany, Italy, he restored the building.

New buildings or new portions of buildings 
 1835, Ancona, Marche, Italy, he worked on the building decorations.
 1857–1863, façade of Santa Croce, Florence, Tuscany, Italy.
 1850–1855, Cimitero delle Porte Sante, near San Miniato al Monte, Florence, Italy

References 

1798 births
1872 deaths
Architects from Florence
Accademia di Belle Arti di Roma alumni
Accademia di Belle Arti di Venezia alumni
Academic staff of the Accademia di Belle Arti di Firenze
Jewish architects